Male is a surname. Notable people with the surname include:

Adri van Male (1910–1990), Dutch football goalkeeper
Arthur Male (1870–1946), Australian politician
Carolyn Male (born 1966), Australian politician
Chris Male (born 1972), English former footballer
Émile Mâle (1862–1954), French art historian
Francis Male, Australian rugby league player
George Male (1910–1998), English footballer
Inoke Male (born 1963), former Fijian rugby union player and former head coach
Job Male (1808–1891), first Mayor of Plainfield, New Jersey
Kitty van Male (born 1988), Dutch field hockey player
Ossie Male (1893–1975), Welsh rugby union player
Tim Male (born 1979), British rower